The Embarcadero and Stockton station is a light rail station in the Fisherman's Wharf district of San Francisco, California, serving the San Francisco Municipal Railway's E Embarcadero and F Market & Wharves heritage railway lines. It is located on The Embarcadero at Stockton Street, in front of Pier 39. The station opened on March 4, 2000, with the streetcar's extension to Fisherman's Wharf.

The stop is also served by the route  bus, plus the  bus route, which provides service along the F Market & Wharves and L Taraval lines during the late night hours when trains do not operate.

References

External links 

SFMTA: The Embarcadero & Stockton St (Pier 39)
SFBay Transit (unofficial): The Embarcadero & Stockton St

Stockton
Fisherman's Wharf, San Francisco
Railway stations in the United States opened in 2000